Dzveli Kveshi is a village in the Bolnisi Municipality of the Kvemo Kartli region of south-eastern Georgia. It is located on the left bank of the Getistskali River, at an altitude of 720 m above sea level. Distance to the municipality center Bolnisi is 13 kilometers.

Demography
According to the 2002 population census of Georgia, the population of the village was 2,183 of which 98% were Azerbaijanis. As of 2014 census, the population of the village declined by 45% and was 1,199.

References

Populated places in Kvemo Kartli
Tiflis Governorate